Qol Quchan (also Romanized as Qol Qūchān, Ghelghoochan, and Qalqūchān) is a village in Chenaran Rural District, in the Central District of Chenaran County, Razavi Khorasan Province, Iran. At the 2006 census, its population was 287, in 75 families.

References 

Populated places in Chenaran County